In relativistic physics, the electromagnetic stress–energy tensor is the contribution to the stress–energy tensor due to the electromagnetic field. The stress–energy tensor describes the flow of energy and momentum in spacetime. The electromagnetic stress–energy tensor contains the negative of the classical Maxwell stress tensor that governs the electromagnetic interactions.

Definition

SI units 

In free space and flat space–time, the electromagnetic stress–energy tensor in SI units is

where  is the electromagnetic tensor and where  is the Minkowski metric tensor of metric signature . When using the metric with signature , the expression on the right of the equals sign will have opposite sign.  

Explicitly in matrix form:

where

is the Poynting vector, 

is the Maxwell stress tensor, and c is the speed of light. Thus,  is expressed and measured in SI pressure units (pascals).

CGS unit conventions 

The permittivity of free space and permeability of free space in cgs-Gaussian units are

then:

and in explicit matrix form:

where Poynting vector becomes: 

The stress–energy tensor for an electromagnetic field in a dielectric medium is less well understood and is the subject of the unresolved Abraham–Minkowski controversy.

The element  of the stress–energy tensor represents the flux of the μth-component of the four-momentum of the electromagnetic field, going through a hyperplane ( is constant). It represents the contribution of electromagnetism to the source of the gravitational field (curvature of space–time) in general relativity.

Algebraic properties
The electromagnetic stress–energy tensor has several algebraic properties:

The symmetry of the tensor is as for a general stress–energy tensor in general relativity. The trace of the energy–momentum tensor is a Lorentz scalar; the electromagnetic field (and in particular electromagnetic waves) has no Lorentz-invariant energy scale, so its energy–momentum tensor must have a vanishing trace. This tracelessness eventually relates to the masslessness of the photon.

Conservation laws 

The electromagnetic stress–energy tensor allows a compact way of writing the conservation laws of linear momentum and energy in electromagnetism. The divergence of the stress–energy tensor is:

where  is the (4D) Lorentz force per unit volume on matter.

This equation is equivalent to the following 3D conservation laws

respectively describing the flux of electromagnetic energy density

and electromagnetic momentum density 

See also
Ricci calculus
Covariant formulation of classical electromagnetism
Mathematical descriptions of the electromagnetic field
Maxwell's equations
Maxwell's equations in curved spacetime
General relativity
Einstein field equations
Magnetohydrodynamics
Vector calculus

References

Tensor physical quantities
Electromagnetism